Guatemala–India relations refers to the bilateral ties between India and Guatemala. The countries established diplomatic relations with each other in the 1970s, and have decided to open resident missions in the other country.

Both nations are part of the Non-Aligned Movement.

History 
Vice President of India, Venkaiah Naidu visited Guatemala in its first high level delegation visit to the country since establishing diplomatic relations in 1972. The Vice President visited the historic city of Antigua Guatemala and also discussed about expanding trade ties in the field of culture, wildlife preservation, IT sector and agriculture. He also emphasized on helping the Guatemalan healthcare system with the aid of the pharmaceutical industry back in India.

Economic relations
According to the Ministry of Commerce of the Government of India, total trade between India and Guatemala was worth just $92 million in 2009–10, with India accounting for nearly $87 million worth of the trade or around 95%.

Spice war

There is increased competition between in the production of cardamom between India and Guatemala, among other spices. Some sources have referred to this as a "spice war."

Diplomatic missions
Diplomatic relations between Guatemala and India were established in 1972. India opened its embassy in Guatemala City on 2 May 2011. Guatemala opened its embassy in New Delhi on 9 April 2013.

References

Further reading
  
  
 
 
 
  Guatemala busca ser centro logístico de India
  Empresarios de India interesados en Guatemala - CentralAmericaData : Central America Data
 Llega la Jornada sobre 'Tratados Comerciales con Guatemala, Chile e India', en Cali - Archivo - Archivo Digital de Noticias de Colombia y el Mundo desde 1.990 - eltiempo.com
  India comprará azúcar a Guatemala y Brasil - CentralAmericaData :: Central America Data

 
India
Bilateral relations of India